Promoe (Mårten Edh, born Nils Mårten Ed; 28 April 1976) is a Swedish rapper, and member of Swedish hip hop group Looptroop Rockers, formed in Västerås, Sweden, 1992. He released his fourth album in 2009 entitled Kråksången, and later the same year followed up with the mixtape Bondfångeri. Promoe has a background of graffiti-writing and in turn, many of his songs deal with graffiti. He follows a vegan straight edge lifestyle.

Place in contemporary hip hop
Promoe released his third album in 2006, entitled White Man's Burden.  This was followed with a DVD titled Standard Bearer, which includes a documentary about the development of White Man's Burden and a concert from Copenhagen.

In 2006, the German rapper Kool Savas released a diss track in which he slighted Promoe among other German and international artists. Promoe's response was the song "Sag Was" which he posted on premier German hip hop site rap.de, and was also released on a 7" LP and also on the CD of Standard Bearer in 2007. It has gone as yet without answer.

Promoe has been featured on many tracks with both Swedish and international artists. The song "These Walls Don't Lie", produced by DJ Large and mixed by Soundism, used a sample from Hugo Montenegro's "Classical Gas", which had already been known for its use in "Mama" by late New York based rapper Big Punisher.

In 2009, Promoe released his first album in Swedish called Kråksången. The first single, "Svennebanan", was a huge hit and received much airtime on several radio stations as well as 120,000 views after seven days on YouTube. "Svennebanan" reached #1 in the official Swedish singles chart. The song criticises Swedes by mockingly using the widely spread stereotype "Svennebanan". The highly sarcastic lyrics did not prevent it from gaining a widespread popularity, allegedly because of the song's Euro disco-beat, which was  commented on in the song "Skäggig Vegan" (Bearded Vegan). Having the same beat as "Svennebanan", and having a title similarly pronounced, the lyrics are highly critical towards the reception of the former song: 
The original text: (in Swedish)

The second single off the album, "Mammas Gata", was released on September 11. He also released a mixtape called Bondfångeri in September.

Discography
 Fuck A Record Deal EP (1996)
 Government Music (2001)
 Long Distance Runner (2004)
 White Man's Burden (2006)
 Standard Bearer (2007)
 Kråksången (2009)
 Generation Kill (2009)
 Lullabies to myself (2009)
 Bondfångeri mixtape (2009)
 Scimmie Metropolitane (Boo Boo Vibration and Promoe) (2010)
 Mellan passion & mani (2015)
 Fult folk (2016)
 Promoe & Don Martin - Public Enemy (2019)
 Promoe - The Art of Losing (2019)

Personal life
Running has been a favorite for years and Promoe has also released an album and song titled "Long Distance Runner", recorded and mixed by Soundism's Vladi Vargas and produced by Embee. Promoe has done races of different distances, including the Sahara Marathon and Kilimanjaro Marathon.

Promoe also loves football. He's a fan of IFK Göteborg.

See also
 Swedish hip hop
 Looptroop Rockers
 Eastern Sunz, a hip hop duo who featured Promoe in one of their albums

References

External links

 Looptroop official website
 Promoe unofficial fansite
 Promoe's MySpace
 Cmotan MC vs Promoe - Nursery Rhymes
 

Swedish rappers
People from Västerås
1976 births
Living people
Swedish-language singers
Swedish anarchists